The canton of Guidel is an administrative division of the Morbihan department, northwestern France. It was created at the French canton reorganisation which came into effect in March 2015. Its seat is in Guidel.

It consists of the following communes:
 
Bubry
Calan
Cléguer
Gestel
Guidel
Inguiniel
Inzinzac-Lochrist
Lanvaudan
Plouay
Pont-Scorff
Quistinic

References

Cantons of Morbihan